The Violin Concerto No. 2 in B minor, Op. 7, was composed by Niccolò Paganini in Italy in 1826. In his Second Concerto, Paganini holds back on the demonstration of virtuosity in favor of greater individuality in the melodic style. The third movement of Paganini's Second Concerto owes its nickname "La Campanella" or "La Clochette" to the little bell which Paganini prescribes to presage each recurrence of the rondo theme. The character of the bell is also imitated in the orchestra and in some of the soloist's passages featuring harmonics. The outcome is a very transparent texture, with the rondo theme having hints of musical qualities associated with Romani music. This movement has served as the basis of compositions by other composers, such as the Étude S. 140 No. 3 "La campanella" by Liszt, and Strauss I's Walzer à la Paganini Op. 11.

Structure 
The concerto is in three movements:

In addition to the solo violin, the work is scored for 2 flutes, 2 oboes, 2 clarinets, 2 bassoons, 2 horns, 2 trumpets, 3 trombones, serpentone (now usually performed on tuba), timpani, bass drum, F# bell, and strings.

External links 
 

2
1826 compositions
Compositions in B minor